Erjiecaris Is an extinct genus of bivalved Cambrian arthropod, known from the Chengjiang Biota of Yunnan, China. It is only known from a single species Erjiecaris minisculo. Unlike most bivalved arthropods, its simple, unstalked eyes are placed on top of the headshield. It was likely a nektobenthic (swimming above ocean floor) deposit feeder. The relationship of Erjiecaris to other arthropods was considered uncertain in its original description. A later study suggested it was a member of Hymenocarina.

References 

Cambrian arthropods
Fossil taxa described in 2014
Cambrian genera